When I'm with You may refer to:

 "When I'm with You" (Sheriff song)
 "When I'm with You" (Faber Drive song)
 "When I'm with You" (Steve Harley song)
 "When I'm with You" (Sparks song)
 "When I'm with You", a song by Simple Plan from No Pads, No Helmets...Just Balls
 "When I'm with You", a song by Tom Cochrane from Hang on to Your Resistance
 "When I'm with You", a song by Westlife from Back Home
 "When I'm with You", a 2009 song by Best Coast
 "When I'm with You", a song by Novena
 "When I'm with You", a song by Citizen Way from 2.0
 "When I'm with You" (BGYO song)